The Jardins d'Eau (Water Gardens, 3 hectares) are botanical gardens located in Saint Rome, Carsac-Aillac, Dordogne, Aquitaine, France. They are open May to October; an admission fee is charged.

The gardens are set above the river Dordogne, and contain 16 lotus species (Nelumbo and Nymphaea), and other aquatic plants including Caltha, Glyceria, Pontederia, and Sagittaria, as well as waterside plants including Cyperus papyrus, Gunnera manicata, Hosta, Iris, and Lobelia.

See also 
 List of botanical gardens in France

References 
 Les Jardins d'Eau
 1001 Fleurs entry *(French)
 Gralon.net entry (French)
 Plurielles entry (French)

Jardins d'Eau
Jardins d'Eau